The Nécessaire egg is an Imperial Fabergé egg, one of a series of fifty-two jeweled eggs made under the supervision of Peter Carl Fabergé for the Russian Imperial family. It was crafted and delivered to the then Tsar of Russia, Alexander III who presented it to his wife, Maria Feodorovna on Easter day 1889. The egg is one of the lost Imperial eggs, but is known to have survived the Russian Revolution and was sold by Wartski in London in 1952.

Design of egg
This egg was designed as an étui containing woman's toilet items. While the exact appearance of the egg is not known, it is described in the 1917 inventory of confiscated imperial treasure as being decorated with "multi-colored stones and brilliants, rubies, emeralds and sapphires."

Surprise in egg
The surprise was the fact that egg was essentially an etui, or necessaire, with 13 diamond-encrusted implements and toilet articles.

History
On 9 April 1889, Alexander III presented the egg to his wife, Maria Feodorovna. It was housed at the Gatchina Palace and was taken on at least one trip to Moscow, as demonstrated by an invoice for the trip which describes the egg. 

After the 1917 revolution the Nécessaire Egg was seized along with the rest of the imperial eggs and sent to the Armoury Palace of the Kremlin. During the early part of 1922 the egg was transferred to the Sovnarkom. It was last shown at Wartski Ltd., court jewelers and Fabergé specialists. It was shown at Wartski's in 1949 as part of the first dedicated exhibition of Faberge's works in Europe. It was later acquired and sold by the firm. In an article on the egg, Wartski states, "It was last recorded [on our premises] on the 19th June 1952 when it was sold to a buyer named as ‘A Stranger’ for £1250...The purchaser’s anonymity was safeguarded throughout Wartski’s records and they remain unidentified." Its current whereabouts are unknown.

See also
Egg decorating
List of missing treasure

References

Sources

External links

 
 Website by Annemiek Wintraecken, details on each of the Fabergé Eggs

Lost Fabergé eggs
1889 works
Imperial Fabergé eggs